Itsandra was one of the two major sultanates on the island of Grand Comore before the French colonization of the Comoros. It was taken over by the Sultanate of Anjouan in 1886 and became a part of the united Sultanate of Ngazidja.

References
 World Statesmen.org
 Les Sultans de Grande Comore

History of the Comoros